Wladyslew Mikhailovitch Blazewicz (3 August 1881 – 10 April 1942), commonly known as Vladislav Blazhevich, was a trombonist, music pedagogue, conductor, and notable composer. Blazhevich was a professor of trombone at the Moscow Conservatory and is widely known for his method books and concertos written for trombone and tuba. He published his first étude book, the "School for Trombone" in 1916.

Early life
Blazhevich was born in 1881 in Tregulovka, in the Smolensky Uyezd of the Smolensk Governorate of the Russian Empire, and soon became an orphan early in life when his mother passed away in 1887 and his father became a political prisoner in 1881. Blazhevich was sent to live with his father's family where they had his music education start with an army band in Smolensk at age 12. Blazhevich studied music in this band (playing euphonium and then trombone) until he turned 18 when he moved to Moscow and began studying at the Moscow Conservatory under the trombone professor there, Christopher Bork.

References 

1881 births
1942 deaths
People from Smolensky District, Smolensk Oblast
People from Smolensky Uyezd
Trombonists from the Russian Empire
Conductors (music) from the Russian Empire
Soviet conductors (music)
Trombonists from the Soviet Union
Academic staff of Moscow Conservatory